Veles  may refer to:
Veles (god), Slavic deity
Veles Municipality, in North Macedonia
Veles, North Macedonia, a city, seat of the municipality, formerly called Titov Veles
Veles Bastion, Stribog Mountains on Brabant Island, Antarctica
Veles, singular of velites, a class of infantry in the early Roman Republic
Veles, a genus of birds, only containing the brown nightjar
the proper name of the exoplanet HD 75898 b

See also
Velež Mountain, south-central Herzegovina, named after the deity
Volos, a city in Greece
 Velestovo, Montenegro, a village in Montenegro